Vikram Solar Limited is an Indian company based in Kolkata, the largest solar module manufacturer in India (by capacity) with 2.5 GW module manufacturing capacity annually and the second-largest solar energy company in India by revenue. The company's primary business focus is manufacturing solar PV modules and also carries out engineering, procurement and construction services and operations and maintenance of solar power plants.

History
Vikram Solar was founded in 2006 by Gyanesh Chaudhary as a manufacturer of solar modules, and it has since moved into Engineering, procurement, and construction management, and solar power plant operations and maintenance. In 2015 the company completed the first floating solar power plant in India.

In February 2014, the company was listed as India's only Tier 1 module manufacturer by Bloomberg New Energy Finance.

In October 2015, the company concluded an agreement with British Solar Renewables (BSR) to supply modules with a total output of 30 MW.

In April 2015, Vikram Solar's modules received the "Excellent Performance" certificate.

In December 2015, The company contributed in commissioning of India's largest rooftop airport installation in Kolkata.

In January 2016, The company became one of three solar players by India Solar Photovoltaic Market Outlook.

In February 2016, the company partnered with Powertech Africa, an African distributor of energy technology, thereby entering 14 new markets in Sub-Saharan Africa, including Botswana, Zimbabwe and Tanzania. Vikram Solar already operates offices in Kenya, Uganda and South Africa.

In June 2016, the company won the National Excellence Award.

In September 2016, Vikram Solar signed a MoU with teamtechnik.

In October 2016, Vikram launched a strategic cooperation to enter the Finnish market.

In November 2016, Vikram Solar announced a MoU with the Indian Institute of Engineering Science and Technology (IIEST) at the Rashtrapati Bhavan.

In June 2017, with a manufacturing capacity of 1 GW, the company had become one of the largest solar modules manufacturers in India.

In July 2017, Vikram Solar modules became one of the top performing modules by DNV GL testing standards.

In October 2017, Vikram Solar launched the new monocrystalline product line SOMERA.

In January 2018, Mr Gyanesh Chaudhary appointed as the Chairman of Renewable Energy & Energy Storage Division of IEEMA.

In February 2018, the company opened a sales office in Massachusetts, United States.

In March 2018, Vikram Solar tied up with France's CEA to drive innovative technology research and development.

In May 2018, Vikram Solar opened an office in Gurgaon.

In June 2018, the company announced to launch a Tigo-integrated Smart module called SOLIVO at Intersolar Munich 2018.

In September 2018, Vikram Solar launched a half-cut cell module at REI 2018.

In January 2019, the company won a contract to install a 140 MW Solar Project for the NTPC.

In April 2020, the company bagged 300 MW project from National Thermal Power Corporation Limited, (NTPC)

In March 2020, the company ranked 32 on Fortune India's Next 500 list

In December 2020, the company commissioned 919.73 kWp rooftop plant to power a part of our solar manufacturing in Falta, West Bengal

In January 2021, the company launched the highly advanced new M6 cell series modules as first Tier 1 company in India

In May 2021, Vikram Solar commissioned (140+85) 225 MW plant for NTPC in Uttar Pradesh  largest in the state

In May 2021, Vikram Solar continued to be the 'Top Performer' in PVEL PQP Reliability Scorecard for the 4th time in last 5 years

In June 2021, Vikram Solar crossed 3 GW capacity in terms of modules shipped globally

In July 2021, Vikram Solar becomes India's largest module manufacturer with up to 2.5 GW capacity; inaugurates 1.3 GW module manufacturing facility

Projects 
Below are some of Vikram Solar's project references:

India 
 225 MW  Bilhaur, Uttar Pradesh (2021)
200 MW  Anatapuramu, Andhra Pradesh (2018)
 20MW  Ayodhya, Uttar Pradesh (2019) 
 10 MW – Itrasi, Madhya Pradesh (2018)
 10 MW – Dahej Port, Gandhar, Hazira (2018)
1461 kW Rooftop – Gujarat (2018)
350 kW Rooftop – Cossipore (2018)
100 kW Rooftop – Haryana (2018)
130 MW – Rajasthan (2017)
80 MW – Charanka, Gujarat (2017)
 20 MW – Karnataka (2017)
 10 MW – Tirupati, Andhra Pradesh (2017)
100 kW Rooftop – Patna (2017)
10 kW Floating Solar Plant – Kolkata (2015)

Abroad 
Vikram Solar Supplied 4.3 MW of Modules for a solar farm in Ware, Massachusetts, United States.

Vikram Solar Supplied 52.6 MW of Modules to Southern Current, United States.

4.2 MW project commissioned in the US with Vikram Solar modules.

312 kWp solar system installed by Finnwind Oy with Vikram Solar modules at Helsinki-Vantaa Airport.

Recognition

In 2020

 Won Module Manufacturer of the Year: Make In India (1.2 GW), Smart Technology Innovation of the Year  Cell Modules, Outstanding Technology Innovation of the Year  MBB Half-cell Modules, Technology of the Year: Utility Solar Module, Module Company of the Year: Testing equipment Award in PV Module Tech Awards by Solar Quarter on 12 November
 Best Performing Modules of the Year and Best Solar Project on-site Service team Award by Solar Quarter at RE Assets India on 21 February
 Business Leader of the Year Award by ET Now in Customer Centric Excellence category on 19 February
 Module Manufacturer of the Year award by Solar Quarter at Indian Rooftop Solar Congress India event on 27 January

In 2019

 Active Customer Engagement Award from CII on 22 January
 India Rooftop Solar Congress Leadership Awards 2018 by Solar Quarter on 17 January
 CBIP Awards from Power Minister Shri R.K. Singh on 4 January
 India's Most Preferred Brands Award on 3 January

In 2018

 No. 1 Solar Panel Manufacturer of the year and No. 1 Grid Sharing Solar PV Power Solution Provider of The Year award from Soft Disk on 8 December
 Dare-to-Dream Awards, Kolkata manufacturing leadership awards and Kolkata Best Employer Brand Awards on 30 October
 Leading RE Manufacturer Awards from REI event on 17 September
 Solar Module Company of the Year and Rooftop Solar EPC Company of the Year award by Solar Quarter on 18 January
 Fastest Growing Company by ET Bengal Corporate Awards on January

In 2017

 Gold Certificate of Merit by Frost & Sullivan on 13 December
 Kolkata Best Employer Brand awards by Employer Branding Institute India on 8 November
 Leading Renewable Energy Manufacturer Solar Module Awards by REI on 20 September
 CEO and MD of Vikram Solar, Mr. Gyanesh Chaudhary was conferred with Emerging Leader Award by CMA on 16 March

In 2016

 Fastest growing company in INR 3001000 crore category by Economic Times of India
 National excellence award for Rooftop Solar Power Projects in the Domestic Solar Module Manufacturers Category by MNRE on 13 June

See also

 Solar power in India

References

Manufacturing companies based in Kolkata
Solar energy companies of India
Indian companies established in 2006
Indian brands
2006 establishments in West Bengal
Energy companies established in 2006
Manufacturing companies established in 2006